A Kist o Wurds is a BBC Northern Ireland Ulster-Scots radio programme that has been running since 2002. The show is produced by Chris Spurr, for Blackthorn Productions. Each week it contains a selection of music, poetry and news from across the country and is a source of information on the Ulster-Scots language, culture, literary traditions and history. Broadcast on BBC Radio Ulster on Sundays at 4pm and repeated on Wednesdays at 7.30pm on Radio Ulster and Radio Foyle.

Presenters
The radio programme is often presented by Anne Morrison-Smyth and Helen Mark, and other presenters include: Charlie Gillen, Conal Gillespie, Jackie Morrison, Laura Spence, Tracey Gillen, Will McAvoy, Willie Cromie, Charlie Reynolds, Alister McReynolds, Willie Drennan, Wilson Burgess and Andy Mattison.

References

External links 

 BBC Ulster-Scots Voices
 BBC Robin's Readings
 The Ulster-Scots Language Society
 Ulster-Scots Community Network
 Ulster-Scots Agency

Ulster Scottish
Radio programmes in Northern Ireland
Scots-language mass media
BBC Radio Ulster programmes
2002 establishments in Northern Ireland
2002 radio programme debuts